is a Japanese animation artist and character designer. Her most famous work is on the TV series The Rose of Versailles and Saint Seiya.

Career 
In 1973 she began her collaboration with Shingo Araki working on Cutie Honey and went on to work at Toei Animation before forming Araki Productions with him in 1975. Together they have worked on many successful films and series. Typically, she works on the female characters while he works on the male.

Some of her works are Lupin III (1977), The Rose of Versailles (1979), The Flower Child Lunlun (1979), Ulysses 31 (1981), Arcadia of My Youth: Endless Orbit SSX (1982), and the OVA versions of Fūma no Kojirō (1991).

International accreditation came with Saint Seiya (aka Knights of the Zodiac, 1986), for her elegant drawing style along with Araki's dynamic drawing style.

Work 
Her work includes the following:

Movies 
 Space Adventure Cobra (1982), animator
 Saint Seiya Gekijôban (Saint Seiya: The Movie) (1987), character designer, key animator
 Saint Seiya, Kamigami no Atsuki Tatakai (Saint Seiya: The Heated Battle of the Gods) (1988), character designer
 Saint Seiya, Shinku No Shônen Densetsu (Saint Seiya: Legend of Crimson Youth) (1988), animator, character design
 Saint Seiya, Saishû Seisen No Senshi Tachi (Saint Seiya: Warriors of the Final Holy Battle) (1989), character designer
 Gegege no Kitaro: Dai Kaijū (Gegege no Kitarō: The Great Sea Beast) (1996), character designer, animation director
 Gegege no Kitaro: Yōkai Tokkyū! Maboroshi no Kisha (Gegege no Kitarō: Yōkai Express! The Phantom Train) (1997), character designer, animation director
 Siam Neko - First Mission (The Siamese - First Mission) (2001), character designer
 Seiya, Tenkai-hen Josou Overture (Saint Seiya: Heaven Chapter ~ Overture) (2004), character designer, main animation designer

TV 
 Hana no Ko Lunlun (1979–1980), character designer
 Berusaiyu no Bara (The Rose of Versailles) (1979–1989), character designer, animation director
 Lupin VIII (1981), design supervisor
 Ulysses 31 (1981–1982), animator, character designer
 Heathcliff and the Catillac Cats (1984–1988), key animator
 Garasu no Kamen (Glass Mask) (1984), key animator (opening)
 Saint Seiya (1986–1989), character designer
 Yokoyama Mitsuteru Sangokushi (1991–1992), character designer
 Aoki Densetsu Shoot! (1993–1994), character designer
 Gegege no Kitaro (1996–1998), character designer
 Yu-Gi-Oh! (1998), character designer
 Yu-Gi-Oh! Duel Monsters (2000–2004), character designer
 Ring ni Kakero 1 (2004), character designer
 Ring ni Kakero 1: Nichibei Kessen Hen (2006), character designer

OVA 
 Amon Saga (1986), character designer, animation director
 Okubyo na Venus (1986), animation director
 Fuma no Kojirou: Yasha-hen (Yasha Chapter) (1989), character designer
 Fuma no Kojirou: Seiken Sensou-hen (Sacred Sword War Chapter) (1990) : Character Design.
 Babiru Ni-Sei (Babel II) (1992), character designer
 Fuma no Kojirou: Fuma Hanran-hen (Fuma Rebellion Chapter) (1992), character designer
 Saint Seiya: The Hades Chapter - Sanctuary (2002), character designer
 Saint Seiya: The Hades Chapter - Inferno (2005–2007), character designer, chief animation director, animation director
 Saint Seiya: The Hades Chapter - Elysion (2008), character designer, chief animation director

Books 
 Alexandria, Illustrator. The Saga is in 9 volumes, each containing 10 b/w illustrations. Volumes 1-2-3-5-6 contains also full colour illustrations. The books' covers also are illustrated by Michi Himeno.

References

External links 
 Michi Himeno anime at Media Arts Database 
 Toei Animation's Saint Seiya website 
 
 

Japanese animators
Japanese animated film directors
Japanese women film directors
Japanese women animators
Japanese women illustrators
Anime character designers
Living people
1956 births